Taylor is an English occupational surname of Norman origin. Listed here are notable people who share this surname.

Art 
Josephine Taylor, American artist
Leonard Campbell Taylor (1874–1969), English painter and war artist
Mary Taylor (born 1948), New Zealand artist
Persis Goodale Thurston Taylor (1821–1906), American/Hawaiian painter and sketch artist
Tanya Taylor, Canadian fashion designer

Business 
Alec Taylor Sr. (1821–1894), British racehorse trainer
Alec Taylor Jr. (1862–1943), British racehorse trainer
Cora V. Taylor (1884-1971), American businesswoman
E. P. Taylor (1901–1989), Canadian businessman and horse breeder
Frank Taylor (1905–1995), English businessman, founder of Taylor Woodrow
Frederick Southgate Taylor (1847–1896), American businessman, politician and founder of Pi Kappa Alpha fraternity
Frederick Winslow Taylor (1856–1915), American engineer and management scholar
Jack C. Taylor (1923–2016), founder of Enterprise Rent-a-Car
John Taylor (Taylor Ham) (1837–1909), American businessman
John William Taylor (1827–1906), British bellfounder
Rebecca Taylor (born 1969), New Zealand-born fashion designer

Entertainment 
Al Taylor (actor) (1887–1951), American silent film actor
Alex Taylor (singer) (1947–1993), American singer
Andy Taylor (born 1961), English guitarist with Duran Duran
Aston George Taylor Jr., American disc jockey, rapper, record producer, actor, and host; better known as Funkmaster Flex
Buck Taylor (born 1938), American actor and artist
Cecil Taylor (1929–2018), American pianist and poet
Christine Taylor (born 1971), American actress, wife of Ben Stiller
Corey Taylor (born 1973), American musician, best known as the lead singer of Slipknot
Courtenay Taylor (born 1969), American voice actress
Dave D. Taylor, game programmer formerly employed by id Software
Dean Taylor (musician), American rock guitarist
Deems Taylor (Joseph Deems Taylor, 1885–1966), American composer, music critic, and promoter of classical music
Demetria Taylor (born 1973), American Chicago blues singer and songwriter
Dick Taylor (born 1943), English musician and early Rolling Stones bassist
Don Taylor (1920–1998), American actor and film director
Dorothy Brenda Taylor (1909–1996), better known as Brenda Forbes, British-born American actress
Dub Taylor (1907–1994), American actor
Eddie Taylor (1923–1985), American electric blues guitarist and singer
Eddie Taylor Jr. (1972–2019), American blues guitarist, singer and songwriter
Elizabeth Taylor (1932–2011), English-American actress
Estelle Taylor (1894–1958), American actress, singer, model, and animal rights activist
Eva Taylor (1895–1977), American blues singer and stage actress
Gwen Taylor (born 1939), English actress
Hound Dog Taylor (1915–1975), American blues guitarist, singer and bandleader
Jack Taylor (actor) (born 1936), American horror movie actor
Jack Taylor (heavyweight man) (c. 1946 – 2006), heaviest man in Britain at his death
Jack Taylor (musician) (1965–1997)
James Taylor (born 1948), American singer-songwriter 
James "J.T." Taylor (born 1953), lead singer of Kool & the Gang
Jane Taylor (1783–1824), English poet and novelist, wrote "Twinkle, Twinkle, Little Star"
Janie Taylor, American ballet dancer, former New York City Ballet principal dancer
The Game (born Jayceon Terrell Taylor in 1979), American rapper 
Jen Taylor (born 1973), American actress
Joanna Taylor (born 1978), English actress and former model
John Taylor (bass guitarist) (born 1960), British co-founder of Duran Duran
Johnnie Taylor (1934–2000), American singer-songwriter
Johnny Taylor, Jr., stand-up comedian
Little Johnny Taylor (1943–2002), American singer
Kate Taylor (born 1949), American singer-songwriter
Karen Taylor (comedian) (born 1979), British comedian
Koko Taylor (1928–2009), American singer
Krissy Taylor (1978–1995), American model and sister of Niki Taylor
Larry Taylor (1942–2019), American bass guitarist, member of the rock band Canned Heat
Lili Taylor (born 1967), American actress
Livingston Taylor (born 1950), American singer-songwriter
Maria Taylor (born 1976), American singer
Melvin Taylor (born 1959), American musician
Mick Taylor (born 1949), English guitarist, formerly with the Rolling Stones
Niki Taylor (born 1975), American model and business woman
Niti Taylor (born 1994), Indian model and actress
Noah Taylor (born 1969), Australian actor
Otis Taylor (born 1948), American musician
Paul Taylor (choreographer) (1930–2018), American dancer and choreographer
Paula Taylor (born 1983) Thai actress and model 
R. Dean Taylor (1939–2022), Canadian singer-songwriter
 Ralph Forbes Taylor (1904–1951), better known as Ralph Forbes, English actor
Regina Taylor (born 1960), American actress and playwright
Rip Taylor (1934–2019), American actor and comedian
Robert Taylor (1911–1969), American actor
Rod Taylor (1932–2015), Australian actor
Rod Taylor (singer) (born 1957), Jamaican singer
Roger Taylor (Duran Duran drummer) (born 1960)
Roger Taylor (Queen drummer) (born 1949)
Ronnie Taylor (1924–2018), British cinematographer
Russi Taylor (1944–2019), American voice actress
Ruth Taylor (actress) (1908–1984), American film actress, starred in silent movies
Sarah Taylor (personality), Canadian television personality
Sean Taylor (musician) (born 1968), Australian guitarist
Sharon Taylor, Canadian actress
Shooby Taylor (1929-2003), American singer
Steve Taylor (born 1957), American recording artist and film director
Tiffany Taylor (born 1977), American model
Tim Brooke-Taylor (1940–2020), English comic actor
Vaughn Taylor (actor) (1910–1983), American actor
Veronica Taylor (born 1978), American voice actress
 Vin Taylor (1896–1961), American film set designer
Vincent Taylor (musician) (1949–1974), American guitarist with band Sha Na Na
 Taylor is the family name in the television show Home Improvement

Journalism and literature 
Brandon Taylor, American writer
Bride Neill Taylor (1858–1937), American journalist and author
Cory Taylor (writer) (1955–2016), Australian writer
D. J. Taylor (born 1960), British author
David Taylor (veterinarian) (1934–2013), British author and television presenter on animal subjects
Edgar Taylor (translator) (1793–1839), first English translator of Grimms' Tales
Emily Taylor (1795–1872), English schoolmistress, poet, children's writer, hymn-writer
George Augustine Taylor (1872–1928), Australian artist and journalist
G. P. Taylor (born 1958), British author
John Ellor Taylor (1837–1895), English popular science writer, journalist and museum curator
Kathrine Taylor (1903–1996), American author, known mostly for her Address Unknown (1938)
Matt Taylor (meteorologist) (born 1976), BBC weather presenter
Minnetta Theodora Taylor (1860-1911), American author, known for writing the lyrics to the National Suffrage Anthem
Patrick Gordon Taylor (1896–1966), Australian author and aviator
Russell Taylor (cartoonist) (born 1960), British writer and cartoonist
Ruth Ashton Taylor (born 1922), American television journalist
Samuel W. Taylor (1907–1997), American novelist, scriptwriter, and historian
Sean Taylor (author), British children's book author
Tom Taylor (writer) (born 1978), Australian playwright and editorial writer
Valerie Taylor (novelist) (1913–1997), American writer of lesbian pulp fiction
William Taylor (man of letters) (1765–1836), English scholar and linguist

Liberal arts and sciences 

A. J. Taylor (1911–2002), English historian
A. J. P. Taylor (1906–1990), English historian
Alan D. Taylor (born 1947), mathematician
Alfred Edward Taylor (1869–1945), British philosopher
Andrew Taylor (poet) (born 1940), Australian poet, professor
Anna Heyward Taylor (1879–1956), American artist
Bert Leston Taylor (1866–1921), American columnist, humorist, poet, and author
Brook Taylor (1685–1731), English mathematician
Charles Taylor (philosopher) (born 1931), Canadian philosopher
Charles Vincent Taylor (1885–1946), American biologist
Charlotte De Bernier Taylor (1806–1863), American entomologist
Dwight Willard Taylor (1932–2006), American malacologist
Edward Taylor (c. 1642 – 1729), colonial American poet, physician, and pastor
Effie J. Taylor (1874–1970), Canadian nurse 
Esther W. Taylor (1826-1904), American physician
Eva Germaine Rimington Taylor (1879-1966), English geographer and historian of science
F. Sherwood Taylor (1897–1956), British historian of science and museum curator
Fred M. Taylor (1855–1932), American economist
Frederick Taylor (historian) (born 1947), British historian
Garth Taylor (ophthalmologist) (1944–2005), Jamaican ophthalmologist
Geoffrey Ingram Taylor (1886–1975), British physicist and mathematician
George Taylor (botanist) (1904–1993), Scottish botanist
George Ledwell Taylor (1788–1873), English architect
George W. Taylor (professor) (1901–1972), American academic and labor mediator
Henry Osborn Taylor (1856–1941), American historian and legal scholar
Isaac M. Taylor (1921–1996), American physician and academic
Jill Bolte Taylor (born 1959), American neuroanatomist
John B. Taylor (born 1946), American economist
John Bryan Taylor (born 1929), English physicist
John George Taylor, British official of the Foreign Office, an archaeologist investigating the antiquities of the Middle East
Joseph L. Taylor (1941–2016), American mathematician
Laurie Taylor (sociologist) (born 1936), English sociologist and radio presenter
Margerie Venables Taylor (1881–1963), English historian and archeologist
Matt Taylor (born 1973), project scientist for the Rosetta mission
Richard Taylor (mathematician) (born 1962), British mathematician
Ruth Taylor (poet) (1961–2006), Canadian poet, editor and college professor
Stuart Ross Taylor (1925–2021), New Zealand geochemist and planetary scientist
Thomas Taylor (neoplatonist) (1758–1835), English translator and Neoplatonist
Thomas Taylor (botanist) (1786–1848), English botanist, bryologist, and mycologist
Verta Taylor (born 1948), American sociologist

Military 
David W. Taylor (1864–1940), U.S. Navy admiral and engineer
George Taylor (Alamo defender) (c. 1816 – 1836), soldier in Texas army, died in the Battle of the Alamo
George A. Taylor (1899–1969), American army officer at D-Day invasion, Battle of Normandy
George P. Taylor (fl. 1975–2007), American Air Force Surgeon General
George W. Taylor (general) (1808–1862), American Civil War general
Herbert Taylor (British Army officer) (1775–1839), adjutant general and private secretary to the British monarch
Kenneth M. Taylor (1919–2006), American pilot in World War II
Maxwell Davenport Taylor (1901–1987), American general and diplomat
Richard Taylor (Confederate general) (1826–1879), son of U.S. President Zachary Taylor and Confederate general in the American Civil War
Sarah Taylor (soldier) (1831–1872), American Civil War soldier

Politics and law 
Abby Taylor (born 1985), Tobago politician
Alfred A. Taylor (1848–1931), governor and U.S. Representative from Tennessee
Breonna Taylor (1993–2020), shooting victim of Louisville Metro Police Department, for whom proposed legislation is named
Bronnie Taylor, New South Wales politician
Casper R. Taylor Jr. (born 1934), Maryland politician
Charles G. Taylor (born 1948), former president of Liberia
Charles Taylor (North Carolina politician) (born 1941), former U.S. Congressman from North Carolina
Lady Bird Johnson (born Claudia Alta Taylor, 1912–2007), First Lady of the United States 1963–1969
Dave Taylor (Canadian politician) (born 1953), Alberta politician
David Taylor (Green politician) (born 1957 or 1958), UK politician
David Taylor (Labour politician) (1946–2009), English politician, MP 1997–2009
David James Taylor  (1889–1969), Ontario politician
Dean P. Taylor (1902–1977), American Congressman from New York
Dick Taylor (Iowa politician) (born 1931), Iowa state representative
Dorothy Mae Taylor (1928–2000), African-American politician and civil rights activist from New Orleans, Louisiana
Fawcett Taylor (1878–1940), Canadian politician and judge
George Taylor (Pennsylvania politician) (c. 1716–1781), signer of the U.S. Declaration of Independence
George Taylor (Leeds South) (1840–1919), Canadian House of Commons member
George Taylor (New York Representative) (1820–1894), American Congressman from New York
George Sylvester Taylor (1822–1910), American Massachusetts State senator
George W. Taylor (Alabama politician) (1849–1932), American Congressman from Alabama
George William Taylor (born 1937), Canadian solicitor general
Horatio T. Taylor (1827–1905), American politician in Wisconsin
Hoyt Patrick Taylor (1890–1964), American politician
Hoyt Patrick Taylor Jr. (1924–2018), American politician
Ian Taylor (born 1945), English politician and member of the Conservative Party
James Madison Taylor, aka Matt Taylor (fl. 1868–1886), early Idaho settler and builder of the Taylor Bridge in what is now Idaho Falls
J. Paul Taylor (1920–2023), American politician and educator
Kim Taylor (born 1978), American politician from Virginia
Len Taylor (born 1952), Canadian politician 
Larry Gene Taylor (1953–2005), American Missouri State senator
Maretta Taylor (1935–2013), American politician 
Mary Taylor (politician) (born 1966), American politician from Ohio
Matthew Taylor (Labour politician) (born 1960), chief executive of the Royal Society of Arts, formerly advisor to Tony Blair and director of the IPPR
Matthew Taylor (Liberal politician) (born 1963), Cornish Liberal Democrat MP
Mildred F. Taylor (1905–1981), American politician from New York
Morvalden Angerstoff Taylor (1030-1925), American politician and farmer from Minnesota
Paula Losoya Taylor (1???–1902), Texan early settler and developer of Del Rio, Texas
Rebecca Taylor (politician) (born 1975), English politician
Recy Taylor (1919–2017), African-American civil rights activist
Roy A. Taylor (1910–1995), U.S. Congressman from North Carolina
Sarah Knox Taylor (1814–1835), daughter of US president Zachary Taylor and wife of Jefferson Davis
Sophia Taylor (1847–1930), New Zealand suffragist and landowner
Steve Taylor (politician) (born 1956), Delaware State legislator
Steven W. Taylor (born 1949), Oklahoma Supreme Court justice
Thomas Taylor, Baron Taylor of Blackburn (1929–2016), British Labour Party politician
Thomas Wardlaw Taylor (1833–1917), Canadian lawyer and judge
William Lamborn Taylor (1850-1940), American politician from Indiana
William Lewis Taylor (1931-2010), American civil rights attorney
Zachary Taylor (1784–1850), 12th president of the United States

Religion 
Frederick Howard Taylor (1862–1946), British pioneer Protestant Christian missionary to China
John Taylor (Mormon) (1808–1887), third president of the LDS Church
Mary Virginia Taylor (born 1950), American bishop in the United Methodist Church
Michael Taylor (British killer) (born c. 1944), Englishman accused in the Ossett murder case
Sarah Katherine Taylor (1847-1920), American evangelist in the Advent Christian Church

Sports 
Alan Taylor (footballer, born 1953), English footballer
Alastair Taylor (footballer) (born 1991), English footballer
Ally Taylor (born 2001), Scottish footballer
Alontae Taylor (born 1998), American football player
Angelo Taylor (born 1978), American Olympic gold medalist athlete and coach
Blake Taylor (born 1995), American baseball player
Brian Taylor (cricketer) (1932–2017), English cricketer
Charlie Taylor (rugby league) (1921–2013), English rugby league footballer
Chris Taylor (baseball) (born 1990), American baseball player
Christian Taylor, American athlete
Chuck Taylor (salesman) (1901–1969), basketball player and sneaker pioneer
Colin Taylor (1940–2005), association (soccer) footballer of the 1950s, 1960s and 1970s
Colin Taylor (footballer, born 1971) association (soccer) footballer of  the 1990s
Colin Taylor (rugby league), rugby league footballer of the 1960s
Danielle Taylor (footballer), New Zealand international football (soccer) player
Darrell Taylor (born 1997), American football player
David Taylor (disambiguation), several people
Davion Taylor (born 1998), American football player
Demetrius Taylor (born 1999), American football player
Dennis Taylor (born 1949), Northern Irish snooker player
Deshon Taylor (born 1996), American basketball player
Devin Taylor (American football) (born 1989), American football player
Dick Taylor (Australian rules footballer) (1901–1962)
Dick Taylor (football manager), English manager of Aston Villa F.C.
Digby Taylor (1941–2017), New Zealand sailor
Durell Taylor, American football player
D'Shon Taylor (born 1993), Bahamian basketball player
Elijah Taylor (rugby league) (born 1990), New Zealand rugby league player
F. Morgan Taylor Jr. (1931–2010), American athlete and businessman
Fred Taylor (American football) (born 1976), American NFL running back
Fred Taylor (basketball player) (born 1948), American former NBA player
Fred Taylor (basketball coach) (1924–2002), American college basketball coach
Fred Taylor (football coach) (1920–2013), American college football coach at Texas Christian University
Fred Taylor (footballer, born 1884) (died 1954), English footballer, played for Chelsea 1909–1919
Frederick "Cyclone" Taylor (1884–1970), Canadian ice hockey forward
Gary Taylor-Fletcher (born 1981), English footballer, played for Blackpool F.C.
George Taylor (manager) (1853–1911), American Brooklyn Dodgers manager
Graham Taylor (1944–2017), English footballer
Herbie Taylor (1889–1973), South African cricketer
Ian Taylor (field hockey) (born 1954), English gold medalist at 1988 Seoul Olympics
Ian Taylor (footballer, born 1948), Scottish footballer, played for Aberdeen
Ian Taylor (footballer, born 1968), English footballer, played for Aston Villa
Isaiah Taylor (born 1994), American basketball player in the Israeli Basketball Premier League
J. J. Taylor (born 1998), American football player
Jack Taylor (19th century baseball player) (1873–1900)
Jack Taylor (20th century baseball player) (1874–1938), Chicago Cubs pitcher
Jack Taylor (basketball) (born 1990), American basketball player who set the NCAA single-game scoring record
Jack Taylor (footballer, born 1914) (1914–1978), English footballer and football manager
Jake Taylor (footballer) (born 1991), Welsh footballer
Jack Taylor (referee) (1930–2012), English football referee for the 1974 World Cup Final
Jack Taylor (Scottish footballer) (1872 – after 1910), Everton F.C. player
James Taylor (disambiguation), several people
Ja'Sir Taylor (born 1999), American football player
Jason Taylor (born 1974) Hall of Fame American football player
Jawaan Taylor (born 1997), American football player
Jeff Taylor (basketball) (born 1960), American basketball player
Jeff Taylor (footballer) (1930–2010), English footballer
Jeffery Taylor (born 1989), Swedish basketball player; son of basketball player Jeff Taylor
Jermain Taylor (born 1978), American boxer, former undisputed middleweight champion of the world
Jerome Taylor (born 1984), Jamaican cricketer
Jim Taylor (fullback) (1935-2018), Green Bay Packers player
Candy Jim Taylor (1884–1948), American Negro league baseball player and manager
Jodie Taylor (born 1986), English association football player
John Taylor (rugby league), British rugby league footballer of the 1950s and 1960s
Jonathan Taylor (disambiguation), multiple people
Josh Taylor (baseball) (born 1993), American baseball player
Julie Ann Taylor (born 1961), American voice actress
Jullian Taylor (born 1995), American football player
Kameron Taylor (born 1994), American basketball player for Maccabi Tel Aviv in the Israeli Basketball Premier League and the EuroLeague
Ken Taylor (footballer, born 1931) (died 2016), English footballer
Kris Taylor (born 1984), English footballer
Laura Taylor (born 1999), Australian swimmer
Lawrence Taylor (born 1959), New York Giants
Lewis Taylor (Australian footballer) (born 1995), Australian rules footballer
Levonta Taylor (born 1997), American football player
Lindsay Taylor (born 1981), American basketball player 
Lorraine Taylor (born 1961), New Zealand international football (soccer) player
Maik Taylor (born 1971), German-British association football goalkeeper
Malik Taylor (American football) (born 1995), American football player
Mark Taylor (disambiguation), several people
Matt Taylor (footballer, born 1982), English football player
Matthew Taylor (footballer) (born 1981), English football player, played in the Premier League
Megan Taylor (1920–1993), British Olympic speed skater
Michael A. Taylor (born 1991), American baseball player
Mike Taylor (basketball coach) (born 1972), American basketball coach
Morgan Taylor (1903–1975), American hurdler
Natalie Taylor (born 1984), New Zealand basketball player
Orville Taylor (born 1970), Jamaican track and field sprinter
Otis Taylor (American football) (1942–2023), American football player
Penny Taylor (born 1981), Australian basketball player 
Peta Taylor (1912–1989), English cricketer
Phil Taylor (darts player) (born 1960), English darts player, 16 time world champion
Phil Taylor (footballer, born 1917) (died 2012), English footballer and former manager of Liverpool FC
Rachel Taylor (born 1983), Welsh rugby union player
Richie Taylor, English footballer
Rhys Taylor (born 1990), Welsh footballer
Rob Taylor (footballer, born 1985), English footballer
Ross Taylor (born 1984), New Zealand cricketer
Samad Taylor (born 1998), American baseball player
Sarah Taylor (cricketer) (born 1989), English cricketer
Sarah Taylor (tennis) (born 1981), American tennis player
Sean Taylor (1983–2007), American football player
Shakial Taylor (born 1996), American football player
Shaun Taylor (born 1963), British footballer
Steven Taylor (footballer) (born 1986), British footballer, played for Newcastle United
Taywan Taylor (born 1995), American football player
Trent Taylor (born 1994), American football player
Tyrod Taylor (born 1989), American football player
Tyrone Taylor (born 1994), American baseball player
Vaughn Taylor (born 1976), American golfer
Vincent Taylor (American football) (born 1994), American football player
W. F. Taylor (1877–1945), founding president of the Canadian Amateur Hockey Association
Zac Taylor (born 1983), American football head coach of Cincinnati Bengals

See also

Disambiguation pages

Alexander Taylor (disambiguation)
Andrew Taylor (disambiguation)
Ann Taylor (disambiguation)
Billy Taylor (disambiguation)
Charles Taylor (disambiguation)
Chris Taylor (disambiguation)
Christopher Taylor (disambiguation)
David Taylor (disambiguation)
Dean Taylor (disambiguation)
Derek Taylor (disambiguation)
Dick Taylor (disambiguation)
Edward Taylor (disambiguation)
Fred Taylor (disambiguation)
Geoffrey Taylor (disambiguation)
George Taylor (disambiguation)
Greg Taylor (disambiguation)
Harry Taylor (disambiguation)
Henry Taylor (disambiguation)
Hudson Taylor (disambiguation)
Isaac Taylor (disambiguation)
Jack Taylor (disambiguation)
Jake Taylor (disambiguation)
James Taylor (disambiguation)
Jeffrey Taylor (disambiguation)
Jeremy Taylor (disambiguation)
Jim Taylor (disambiguation)
John Taylor (disambiguation)
Keith Taylor (disambiguation)
Larry Taylor (disambiguation)
Leo Taylor (disambiguation)
Mark Taylor (disambiguation)
Martin Taylor (disambiguation)
Mary Taylor (disambiguation)
Matthew Taylor (disambiguation)
Michael Taylor (disambiguation)
Mike Taylor (disambiguation)
Patrick Taylor (disambiguation)
Paul Taylor (disambiguation)
Richard Taylor (disambiguation)
Robert Taylor (disambiguation)
Sarah Taylor (disambiguation)
Sean Taylor (disambiguation)
Stephen Taylor (disambiguation)
Steven Taylor (disambiguation)
Valerie Taylor (disambiguation)
Walter Taylor (disambiguation)
William Taylor (disambiguation)

Fictional characters
 Alex Taylor, the main character in the video game The Crew
Allison Taylor, recurring character in the TV series 24
 Sheriff Andy Taylor (The Andy Griffith Show), main character in the TV series The Andy Griffith Show
 Dan Taylor, a character in the film Forrest Gump
 Derek Taylor, a character in the American TV sitcom Silver Spoons
 E.Z. Taylor, a fictional character in Three's a Crowd
George Taylor, main character in the film Planet of the Apes
Griffin Pierce-Taylor, character in Degrassi: The Next Generation
Jamie Taylor, a character  from The Haunting of Bly Manor
Jennifer Taylor (Queer As Folk), minor character in the TV series Queer as Folk
Justin Taylor, major character in the TV series Queer as Folk
Karen Taylor, in the BBC soap opera EastEnders
Kelly Taylor (90210), major character in the Beverly Hills, 90210 franchise
Mac Taylor, major character in the TV series CSI: NY
Mia Taylor, a character from a Japanese multi-media idol project Love Live! Nijigasaki High School Idol Club
Michael Taylor, a character in the American television sitcom My Two Dads
Nancy Taylor, a character in the 1993 American fantasy comedy Groundhog Day
Opie Taylor, son of the aforementioned Sheriff Andy Taylor in The Andy Griffith Show
Paul Taylor, a character in the 1988 movie The Blob
Petra Taylor, character in TV series Brookside
Rose Taylor, a character from the TV show 7th Heaven
 Steve Taylor, a character in the 2008 British slasher movie Eden Lake
Steven Taylor (Doctor Who), one of the first companions of the Doctor in the British TV series Doctor Who
Tim Taylor (character), main character in the TV series Home Improvement
Tristan Taylor, minor character in the TV series Yu-Gi-Oh!
 Zach Taylor, a fictional character television series Mighty Morphin Power Rangers
 Taylor is the family name in the television show Home Improvement

Similar names
Tailor (disambiguation)
Tayler
Tylor

Lists of people by surname